The Keys may refer to:
 The Florida Keys, a coral archipelago in southeast United States
 The Keys, Newfoundland and Labrador, a settlement south of Bay Bulls
 The Keys (journal),  the quarterly journal of the League of Coloured Peoples founded in 1933
 "The Keys" (Seinfeld), 1992
 The Keys (English band) 1979–1983
 The Keys, 2002–present, a Welsh band formed by former members of Murry the Hump
 the Keys, South Korean girl group GWSN's fourth extended play
 The Yeoman Warders Club, officially known as "The Keys", a pub in the Tower of London

See also
Key (disambiguation)
The Key (disambiguation)